Jørund Chand Torsvik (born in India on October 12, 1982) is a Norwegian singer who won the first ever Norwegian version of The X Factor that aired from September through December 2009 on TV 2 Norwegian television station. He was born in India, but was adopted by parents from Spillum, Norway.

Chand Torsvik Band
Chand Torsvik – vocals, guitar, harmonica
Dag Kitilsen – drums
Peter Stokstad – guitar
Jonas Hammeren – accordion, keyboards
Lars Jacob Hovik – bass
Magne Hagen Ring – acoustic guitar
Tor-Erik Haagenstad Vik – tambourine
Trym Bendik Hoff – accordion and spoons

Discography

Albums
2004: Ikke ein av dem
2008: Kongeriket Norge
2010: Kongeriket Norge

Singler
2009: "Diamanten"

References

External links
Official site

1982 births
Living people
Norwegian adoptees
The X Factor winners
Norwegian people of Indian descent
21st-century Norwegian singers
21st-century Norwegian male singers